Strudyna, also known as Structural Dynamics Co., Ltd, is a renowned engineering and manufacturer of Stainless Steel Tensile Components for facade structures, with offices and fabrication facilities in the UK, Australia and Thailand, and manufacturing facilities in Thailand.

With engineering and development practices of high tensile components for glass façade structures, building envelope and seismic induced structures, Strudyna focused on solutions aimed for full stress cycle loading structures. The tensile façade engineering leg of Strudyna and parent company Kinzi (Thailand) Co Ltd developed several pioneering solutions for well known façades, including the New Bangkok International Airport, Suntec city façade renovation Singapore and New Doha International Airport Grid H façade Qatar. Other recognizable façade structures include Shilin Sogo department store MPG façade in Taiwan, Marina Bay Sands Casino Ned Kahn Wind Arbor in Singapore, LA Live Ritz Carlton hotel Los Angeles USA and People's Leasing Bank HQ in Colombo Sri Lanka.

The founders developed the trade name Stru-dyna from a shorthand description of the company name Stru-ctural and Dyna-mics, and choose this name as it represented the unique dynamics forces that the stainless steel products are subjected too.

History
After working in several International  façade projects, Kinzi (Thailand) Co Ltd in Thailand and Arcus Wire Group Pty Ltd in Australia, the parent companies of Strudyna, found major flaws in the availability of Stainless Steel components available for the Structural market. Up until then, stainless steel tensile components were primarily designed for the marine industry, in particular yacht standing rigging which were hastily adapted for architecture applications, where by doing this in many cases compromised the aesthetic of the support system. Coupled with shortage of reliable tensile fabrication source, Strudyna was created in 2006 to fill this gap. Since then  Strudyna's engineers have dedicated to developing commercial tensile architectural systems for glass facades, curtain walling, and fabric structures. This enabled the original Kinzi engineers to pursue R&D of new tensile technology for major projects.

Production and processes 

Strudyna's tensile components are manufactured primarily in stainless steel grade AISI 316, A4-80, Duplex and Super Duplex. It is widely considered that the maximum weight of an investment casting (also known as Lost Wax Casting) is 10 kg.  Strudyna's largest tensile casting is the SRS Structural Tie Rod Fork at 66.9 kg.

Strudyna's tensile castings are known for the high standards of 'Passivation’ process.

Certification and certificates

Most Strudyna components are manufactured in Parent company Kinzi’s production plant at Ratchaburi, Thailand, with Thai Industrial Standards Institute accredited ISO/IEC 17025 & ISO 9001:2000 for calibration laboratories; mechanical properties testing and chemical composition testing. The production plant maintains an active twenty-four-hour (24-hour) three-shift (3-shift) production cycle and as of 2011 a production level of 900 tons of tensile stainless steel production per year.

Products

Strudyna’s products are available through its subsidiary offices: Structural Dynamics Co., Ltd in Thailand for Asia, Structural Dynamics Europe Ltd., in England covering Europe, and Structural Dynamics Australia covering Oceania, with a planned Structural Dynamics Inc., opening in 2012 in United States covering the Americas.

Strudyna main ranges of products are:

Stainless Steel Tie-Rod systems.
  
Stainless Steel Tensile Cable Systems.

Stainless Steel Spiders and Rotules Series.

Stainless Steel Tensile Cable - Hamma Pro-Strand (Compacted), Hamma X-Strand (Spiral), and Hamma Mega-Strand (spiral up to dia.42mm)

Major projects
Strudyna and Kinzi have developed and supplied the stainless steel castings in one or the other companies names, and in some instances, Kinzi’s Division, ‘Kinzi Café’, provided integrated solutions for the completion of large-scale glass facade projects:

NBIA (Suvarnabhumi International Airport, Bangkok)
Stainless Steel Castings for Façade of Main Terminal Building Location: Bangkok, Thailand Owner: New Bangkok International Airport Co., Ltd (NBIA) Architect: Murphy/Jahn Inc., Chicago Year of construction: 2004 The main terminal façade envelope of Bangkok's Suvarnabhumi Airport is 1140 meters in length and seven stories high, making it currently the largest glass wall structure in the World today. 37,000 kg of stainless steel wire strand and 19,000 kg of stainless fittings were supplied to this project, many design and manufacturing innovations were made that have now become next generation fittings and standard practices for manufacture and documentation.

Nortel Networks Building
Nortel Networks Australian Head Office Location: Macquarie University Research Park Australia Owner: SAS Trustee Corporation Architect: Bligh Voller Nield Year of construction: 2005 Within Macquarie University Research Park in Sydney, it features Structural Dynamic's ‘Strudyna’ RDS 1.0 structural rod system in 316 grade stainless steel as the supporting feature of the environmental façade screens that encapsulate the building, providing protection from the environment for the occupants without being internal fitted. This project was awarded a 4 star SEDA rating for environmental efficiency.

Taronga Zoo Male Elephant Holding Facility
Project Title: Male Elephant Building Location: Sydney, Australia Owner: Taronga Zoo Architect: Jackson Teece Year of construction: 2009 Taronga Zoo features Structural Dynamic's ‘Strudyna’ 16.0mm 1 X 19 stainless wire strand together with AM swage toggles and PBI rigging screws. The PBI range of rigging screws were selected because of their bronze inserts and large surface area locking nuts, giving the maintenance staff the ability to adjust the tensions when needed. A very simple but effective system customised to match the required breaking strength of the compound design with the redesigned swage studs for the rigging screw bodies.

Suntec City Façade upgrading, Singapore

Stainless Spider, dead load roads, tensile cable assemblies, P2H tensile adjusters, spiders and rotules for Façade. Project Title : Upgrading of Suntec City Location : Suntec city, Singapore  Owner : The Management Corporation Strata Title Plan No. 2197  Architect : Liu & Wo Architects Pte Ltd  Year of construction : 2006 .   In 2006, the old curtain wall was deemed to dark and the owners of requested for an upgrade into a more transparent and bright façade. The renovation was in conjunction to host the 2006 OPEC ministers meeting.  To accommodate this new requirement an upgraded design with point-fixed glass facade system of fish-bone mild steel layout truss was called for.   Strudyna's 1x19 tensile cable assembly was used to reinforce the vertical trusses and kept the truss design small and transparent. The new design of facade will provide more natural light inside the building and a more spacious look.

External links
 Strudyna UK website
 Strudyna Australian website
 Strudyna Thailand website
 Strudyna global website
PRLOG news

References

Design companies established in 2006
Engineering companies of Thailand
International engineering consulting firms
Manufacturing companies based in Bangkok
Thai companies established in 2006
Thai brands